Aston Francis Barrett (born 22 November 1946), often called "Family Man" or "Fams" for short, is a retired Jamaican musician and Rastafarian.

Biography
Born in Kingston, Jamaica, Aston "Family Man"  Barrett was one of the Barrett brothers (the other being the younger brother on drums Carlton "Carly" Barrett) who played with Bob Marley & The Wailers, The Hippy Boys and Lee Perry's The Upsetters. He was the bandleader of Marley's backing band, as well as co-producer of the albums, and the man in charge of the overall song arrangements.

Mentorship
Barrett was the mentor and teacher of Robbie Shakespeare of the duo Sly & Robbie.

Equipment
Barrett played a Fender Jazz Bass, Acoustic 370 bass amplifier.

Legal battle
In 2006 Barrett filed a lawsuit against Island Records, the Wailers' label, seeking £60 million in unpaid royalties allegedly due him and his now deceased brother. The lawsuit was dismissed.

Nickname
Barrett's "Family Man" nickname came about before he had any children of his own. Aston foresaw his role as a band leader and started to call himself "Family Man". He has fathered 41 children since.

Awards and recognition
In 2012 he received a Lifetime Achievement award from Bass Player Magazine.

In 2020 he was selected as number-one by the staff of Bass Player Magazine, in their ranking of: ”20 legendary players who shaped the sound of electric bass."

In 2021 he was honoured in the National Honours and Awards on Jamaica’s 59th Anniversary of Independence.

Quotes
Bass Player (magazine):
Perhaps no music evokes the notion of bass and bass tone like reggae and dub, and no two words are more synonymous with those plucking practices than Family Man.
Ali Campbell (UB40 frontman):
There was bluebeat, rocksteady and ska. That all happened before reggae, which kind of happened in about '69, you know, when reggae as we know it was invented by the Barrett brothers, I'd say.
John Lennon (The Beatles,  discussing his plans for a comeback album in early 1980 while listening to the Bob Marley & The Wailers album Burnin'): 
In fact, if they really wanted the right sound, they should go to Jamaica! Go to the same studio that Bob Marley used! Get down with the Rasta men and smoke ganja in big spliffs or hash in chillums. Then they could get that deep-down, super funky, bass-box sound that comes from Trenchtown. You couldn't get that sound in New York. No way!
Ziggy Marley (Bob Marley's oldest son):
I think the drum and bass, they are a very important part in Bob music. It was, you know, Family Man and Carlton, two brothers. They have their own style.
Keith Richards (The Rolling Stones):
The first time the Wailers went to England, soon after this, I caught them by chance up in Tottenham Court Road. I thought they were pretty feeble compared to what I'd been hearing in Steer Town. But they certainly got their act together real quick. Family Man joined in on the bass, and Bob obviously had all of the stuff required.
Robbie Shakespeare (Sly & Robbie, who has been estimated to have played bass on 200,000 tracks):
Well ... what can I say? He is the man (laughter). Just the way the man plays the bass, you know. There are gun fighters and there are gun fighters, seen? I can't tell you nothing more. He is a master for me. I have had help and influences from other people, but I have to give it mostly to Family Man.

Discography

 The Sound of Macka Dub (Carlton Barrett & Family Man) [aka Macka Dub] [197X]

Compilations
 Familyman in Dub [197X]

Productions

 Aston Barrett – Familyman in Dub [197X]
 Burning Spear – Hail H.I.M. (1980), Radic
 Horace Andy & Winston Jarrett & Wailers – The Kingston Rock [1974]
 Keith Hudson – Pick A Dub [1974]
 Various Artists – Cobra Style [197X]
 Various Artists – Juvenile Delinquent [1981]
 Iya Karna with the Wailers – Inkarnation [1986]

Albums engineered by Aston Barrett

Mixing engineer
 Bob Marley and the Wailers – Confrontation [1983]
 Bob Marley and the Wailers – Exodus [1977]
 Judy Mowatt- Black Woman [1980]
 Various Artists – Juvenile Delinquent [1981]

Recording engineer
 Various artists – Juvenile Delinquent [1981]

Engineer
 Aston Barrett – Familyman n Dub [197X]
 Bob Marley and the Wailers – Catch a Fire [1973]

As a musician he appears on

Bass

 African Brothers – Want Some Freedom [1970–78]
 African Brothers & King Tubby – The African Brothers Meets King Tubby in Dub [197X]
 Aggrovators – Dub Justice [1975–76]
 Aggrovators – Kaya Dub [197X]
 Aggrovators – Reggae Stones Dub [1976]
 Aggrovators & King Tubby's – Dub Jackpot [1974–76]
 Aggrovators & Revolutionaries – Rockers Almighty Dub [1979]
 Al Campbell – Gee Baby [1977]
 Al Campbell – Loving Moods of Al Campbell [1978]
 Alpha Blondy & Wailers – Jerusalem [1986]
 Aston Barrett – Familyman in Dub [197X]
 Augustus Pablo – Dubbing with the Don [197X]
 Augustus Pablo – King Tubbys Meets Rockers Uptown [1972–75]
 Augustus Pablo – Original Rockers [1972–75]
 Augustus Pablo – Original Rockers Vol. 2 [1989]
 Augustus Pablo – The Definitive Augustus Pablo Box Set [197X-8X]
 Augustus Pablo Meets Lee Perry and The Wailers Band – Rare Dubs [1970–71]
 Augustus Pablo & Various Artists – Augustus Pablo Presents DJs From 70s to 80s [197X-8X]
 Big Joe – African Princess [1978]
 Bob Marley and the Wailers – Soul Rebels (1970)
 Bob Marley and the Wailers – Soul Revolution Part II (1971)
 Bob Marley and the Wailers – The Best of The Wailers (1971)
 Bob Marley and the Wailers – Catch a Fire (1973)
 Bob Marley and the Wailers – Burnin' (1973)
 Bob Marley and the Wailers – Natty Dread (1974)
 Bob Marley and the Wailers – Live! (1975)
 Bob Marley and the Wailers – Rastaman Vibration (1976)
 Bob Marley and the Wailers – Exodus (1977)
 Bob Marley and the Wailers – Kaya (1978)
 Bob Marley and the Wailers – Babylon By Bus (1978)
 Bob Marley and the Wailers – Survival (1979)
 Bob Marley and the Wailers – Uprising (1980)
 Bob Marley and the Wailers – Live Forever (1980)
 Bob Marley and the Wailers – Confrontation (1983)
 Bunny Wailer – Blackheart Man (1976) 
 Burning Spear – Marcus Garvey (1975)
 Burning Spear – Garvey's Ghost (1976)
 Burning Spear – Man in the Hills (1976)
 Burning Spear – Dry & Heavy (1977)
 Burning Spear – Marcus' Children – originally released as Social Living (1978)
 Burning Spear – Living Dub Vol. 1 (1979)
 Burning Spear – Living Dub Vol. 2 (1979)
 Burning Spear – Hail H.I.M. (1980)
 Burning Spear – Farover (1982)
 Burning Spear – The Fittest of the Fittest (1983)
 Carlton Barrett & Family Man – The Sound of Macka Dub [197X]
 Delano Tucker – Gather Israelites [197X]
 Delroy Wilson – True Believer in Love [197X]
 Dillinger – 24 Karat Gold Ragnampiza [197X]
 Dillinger – CB 200 [1976]
 Don Carlos – Just A Passing Glance [1984]
 Donald + Lulu With Wailers – Beautiful Garden [1982]
 Errol Thompson & King Tubby – Holy War Dub [197X]
 Glen Brown & King Tubby – Termination Dub [1973–79]
 Haile Selassie I feat. Bob Marley & The Wailers – The War Album [2001]
 Heptones – Unreleased Night Food and Rare Black Ark Sessions [1976–77]
 Horace Andy & Winston Jarrett & Wailers – The Kingston Rock [1974]
 I-Roy – Truths and Rights [1975]
 Impact All Stars – Randy's Dub [1975]
 Israel Vibration - "Unconquered People" [1980]
 Iya Karna With Wailers – Inkarnation [1986]
 Jackie Mittoo – Show Case Volume 3 [1977]
 Jacob Miller – Who Say Jah No Dread [1974–75]
 Jimmy London – Hold On [1977]
 Jimmy London – It Ain't Easy Living in the Ghetto [1980]
 Jimmy London – The Jimmy London Collection [197X]
 Johnny Clarke – Originally Mr. Clarke [1980]
 Johnny Clarke & Delroy Wilson & Doreen Shaffer – Lovers Rock Vol. 2 [197X]
 Josh Heinrichs – Josh Heinrichs & Friends [2010] 
 Justin Hinds – Travel With Love [1982–84]
 Keith Hudson – Pick A Dub [1974]
 Keith Hudson – Torch of Freedom [1975]
 Keith Poppin – Envious [1975]
 Keith Poppin – Pop Inn [1977]
 King Tubby – African Love Dub [1974–79]
 King Tubby – King Tubby's Lost Treasures [1976]
 King Tubby & Errol Thompson – The Black Foundation in Dub [197X]
 King Tubby & Friends – Rod of Correction Showcase [197X]
 Knowledge – Straight Outta Trenchtown [1975–80]
 Larry Ethnic Meets Wailers With Various Artiste – Larry Ethnic Meets The Wailers with Various Artiste [1975]
 Larry Marshall & King Tubby – I Admire You in Dub [1975]
 Lee Perry – Soundz from the Hotline [1976–79]
 Linval Thompson – I Love Marijuana [1978]
 Linval Thompson – Negrea Love Dub [1978]
 Linval Thompson & Friends – Whip Them King Tubby [197X]
 Little Roy – Tafari Earth Uprising [197X]
 Lloyd Willis – Gits Plays Bob Marley's Greatest Hits [1977]
 Max Romeo – Revelation Time [1975]
 Negril – Negril [1975]
 Nuroy & Uroy – The Originator [1976]
 Pablo Moses – In The Future [1983]
 Paragons – Now [1982]
 Pat Kelly – Lonely Man [1978]
 Peter Tosh – Equal Rights [1977]
 Peter Tosh – Legalize It [1976]
 Rita Marley – Who Feels It Knows It [1980]
 Robert Marcey and Familyman with The Wailers – "Wailin' For Justice" [2010]
 Royals – Dubbing with The Royals [197X]
 Royals – Pick Up The Pieces [1977]
 Rupie Edwards – Ire Feelings [1975]
 Scientist – Scientific Dub [1978–80]
 Scratch and Company – Chapter 1, The Upsetters [1970–76]
 Slim Smith – The Very Best Of [196X-7X]
 Sly & Robbie Meet King Tubby – Reggae Rasta Dub [1974–77]
 Sons of Jah – Bankrupt Morality [1978]
 Sons of Jah – Reggae Hit Showcase [1980]
 Sons of Jah – Universal Message [1982]
 Sydney Rogers – Miracle Worker [1974]
 Tennors – Moods [196X-7X]
 Twinkle Brothers – All The Hits Vol. 2 [1971–91]
 Upsetters – Blackboard Jungle Dub [1973]
 Various Artists – 17 North Parade [1972–75]
 Various Artists – Aquarius Rock [197X]
 Various Artists – Clocktower Presents Conquerors in Dub [197X]
 Various Artists – Down Santic Way [1973–75]
 Various Artists – Every Mouth Must Be Fed [1973–76]
 Various Artists – Java Java Dub [1972]
 Various Artists – Juvenile Delinquent [1981]
 Various Artists – Kingston All Stars Meet Downtown at King Tubbys [1972–75]
 Various Artists – Reggae Jeggae [1968–69]
 Various Artists – Rite Sound Reggae Story [1980]
 Various Artists – Santic and Friends [1980]
 Various Artists – Sound System Rockers [1969–75]
 Various Artists – Treasure Isle in Dub [1970–78]
 Various Artists – Wonderman Years [1971–76]
 Vivian Jackson – Ram A Dam [1976]
 Bunny Wailer – Blackheart Man [1976]
 Yabby You – The Yabby You Collection [197X]
 Yabby You & King Tubby – King Tubby's Prophesy of Dub [1976]
 Yabby You & Various Artists – Jesus Dread [1972–77]

Rhythm guitar

 Aggrovators & King Tubby's – Dub Jackpot [1974–76]
 Aggrovators & Revolutionaries – Rockers Almighty Dub [1979]
 Agrovators Meet Revolutionaries – Agrovators Meet Revolutionaries Part II [197X]
 Bunny Wailer – Black Heart Man [1976]
 Cornell Campbell – Dance in a Greenwich Farm [1975]
 Delroy Wilson – For I and I [1975]
 Johnny Clarke – Moving Out [1975]
 Johnny Clarke – Put It On [1975]
 Johnny Clarke – Rockers Time Now [1976]
 Johnny Clarke – Sings in Fine Style [1975]
 King Tubby – Dub from the Roots [1974]
 Owen Gray – Forward on the Scene [1975]
 Scientist – Scientific Dub [1978–80]
 Sons of Jah – Universal Message [1982]
 Tommy McCook & Aggrovators – Cookin [1975]
 Various Artists – Juvenile Delinquent [1981]
 Bunny Wailer – Blackheart Man [1976]

Keyboards

 Bunny Wailer – Black Heart Man [1976]
 Sons Of Jah – Universal Message [1982]
 Various Artists – Juvenile Delinquent [1981]
 Bunny Wailer – Blackheart Man [1976]

Organ

 Aston Barrett – Familyman in Dub [197X]
 Burning Spear – Farover [1982]
 Sylford Walker – Lamb's Bread [1978]
 Vivian Jackson – Ram A Dam [1976]
 Yabby You – Conquering Lion [1977]
 Yabby You & King Tubby – King Tubby's Prophesy of Dub [1976]
 Yabby You & Various Artists – Jesus Dread [1972–77]

Lead guitar

 Sons of Jah – Universal Message [1982]
 Various Artists – Juvenile Delinquent [1981]
 Bunny Wailer – Blackheart Man [1976]

Guitar

 Aston Barrett – Familyman in Dub [197X]
 Bob Marley and the Wailers – Uprising [1980]
 King Tubby – The Roots of Dub [1975]
 Rita Marley – Who Feels It Knows It [1980]
 Wailers- Burnin [1973]

Synthesiser

 Aston Barrett – Familyman in Dub [197X]

Percussion

 Aston Barrett – Familyman in Dub [197X]
 Bob Marley and the Wailers – Uprising [1980]
 Burning Spear – Hail H.I.M. [1980]
 Various Artists – Juvenile Delinquent [1981]

Piano

 Aston Barrett – Familyman in Dub [197X]
 Bob Marley and the Wailers – Uprising [1980]
 Larry Ethnic Meets Wailers with Various Artiste – Larry Ethnic Meets The Wailers with Various Artiste [1975]
 Various Artists – Juvenile Delinquent [1981]

Syndrums

 Various Artists – Juvenile Delinquent [1981]

Melinoco

 Larry Ethnic Meets Wailers with Various Artiste – Larry Ethnic Meets The Wailers with Various Artiste [1975]

Bass drum

 Burning Spear – Farover [1982]

Clavinet

 Burning Spear – Farover [1982]

References

1946 births
Living people
Musicians from Kingston, Jamaica
Jamaican bass guitarists
Jamaican reggae musicians
Jamaican Rastafarians
The Wailers members